The Mask of Dimitrios is a 1944 American film noir directed by Jean Negulesco and written by Frank Gruber, based on the 1939 novel of the same title written by Eric Ambler (in the United States, it was published as A Coffin for Dimitrios).

The film features Sydney Greenstreet, Zachary Scott (as Dimitrios Makropoulos), Faye Emerson and Peter Lorre.  This was the first film for Scott after signing a contract with Warner Bros. Pictures.

Plot
In 1938, the Dutch mystery writer Cornelius Leyden is visiting Istanbul. A fan, Colonel Haki of the Turkish police, believes that Leyden would be interested in the story of Dimitrios Makropoulos, whose body was just washed up on the beach. Leyden is so fascinated by what Haki tells of the dead criminal that he becomes determined to learn more.

He seeks out Dimitrios' associates all over Europe, none of whom has a kind word for the deceased. They reveal more of the man's sordid life. His ex-lover, Irana Preveza, tells of his failed assassination attempt. Afterwards, he borrowed money from her and never returned.

On his travels, Leyden meets Mr. Peters. Later, he catches Peters ransacking his hotel room. Peters reveals that he too had dealings with Dimitrios (he had done prison time when Dimitrios betrayed their smuggling ring to the police), and he is not convinced that the man is really dead. If he is alive, Peters plans to blackmail him for keeping his secret. He generously offers Leyden a share, but the Dutchman is interested only in learning the truth.

Wladislaw Grodek is the next link in the trail. He had hired Dimitrios to obtain some state secrets. Dimitrios manipulated Karel Bulic, a meek minor Yugoslav government official, into gambling and losing a huge sum so that he could be pressured into stealing charts of some minefields. Bulic later confessed to the authorities and committed suicide. Meanwhile, Dimitrios double-crossed Grodek by selling the charts himself to the Italian government.

Eventually, the two men track Dimitrios down in Paris. Fearful of being exposed to the authorities, he pays Peters one million francs for his silence, but true to his nature, goes to Peters' home shortly thereafter and shoots him. Leyden, with his rage over Peters being shot overcoming his fear, grapples with Dimitrios and allows the wounded Peters to grab the gun. Peters sends Leyden away to spare him from witnessing the violence to come, and shots are then heard.

When the police show up, Peters admits to shooting Dimitrios and does not resist arrest, and is satisfied with what he has accomplished. As he is taken away, he asks for Leyden to write a book about the affair and kindly to send him a copy.

Cast
 Sydney Greenstreet as Mr. Peters
 Zachary Scott as Dimitrios Makropoulos
 Faye Emerson as Irana Preveza
 Peter Lorre as Cornelius Leyden
 Victor Francen as Wladislaw Grodek
 Steven Geray as Karol Bulic
 Florence Bates as Madame Elise Chavez
 Eduardo Ciannelli as Marukakis
 Kurt Katch as Colonel Haki
 Marjorie Hoshelle as 	Anna Bulic
 Georges Metaxa as 	Hans Werner
 John Abbott as Mr. Pappas
 Monte Blue as Abdul Dhris
 David Hoffman  as	Konrad
 Carmen D'Antonio as 	Nightclub Dancer 
 Felix Basch as Vazoff
 Fred Essler as Bostoff
 John Mylong as 	Druhar
 Stuart Holmes as Casino Patron

Production
The novel was published in 1939. Film rights were bought by Warner Bros. The screenplay was assigned to A.I. Bezzerides with Henry Blanke to produce and Nancy Coleman and Helmut Dantine to star. Coleman did not like her role and Faye Emerson replaced her. Dantine was assigned to another film and replaced by Zachary Scott who had just impressed on Broadway in Those Endearing Young Charms; it was his first film.

Reception

Critical response
New York Times film critic Bosley Crowther gave the film a mixed review in June 1944: "In telling the picaresque story of a mystery writer on the trail of a Levantine bum whose career of crime in the Balkans has stimulated the writer's awe, the film wallows deeply in discourse and tediously trite flashbacks...To be sure, the Warner schemists have poured some scabby atmosphere into this film and have been very liberal with the scenery in picturing international haunts and Balkan dives...This sort of worldly melodrama calls for refinement in cinematic style, but the writing and direction of this picture betray a rather clumsy, conventional approach."

A Channel 4 review asserts that "the film promises more action than it delivers, but there are opportunities for fine performances by Lorre and, especially, Greenstreet as the master crook. Atmospheric cinematography and an intriguing script turn this into a fine example of film noir with an immensely entertaining cast."

TV Guide calls the movie "One of the great film noir classics to come out of the 1940s, The Mask of Dimitrios boasts no superstars, just uniformly fine talents, a terrific script full of subtle intrigue and surprises, and Negulesco's exciting direction. It's an edge-of-the-seater all the way."

Adaptation
The Mask of Dimitrios was adapted as a radio play aired on the April 16, 1945, broadcast of The Screen Guild Theater, with Greenstreet and Lorre reprising their roles.

Historical inspirations
The character Dimitrios Makropoulos in Ambler's book is based somewhat on the early career of munitions kingpin Sir Basil Zaharoff.

The assassination attempt involving Dimitrios was based on an attempted assassination of Aleksandar Stamboliyski, the prime minister of Bulgaria. The failed assassination attempt took place on February 2, 1923; Stamboliyski survived it but was murdered on June 14 of that same year.

Differences from novel

The film remains relatively faithful to the original novel. Major differences are in the relationship between the novelist and Mr. Peters, which is rather closer than in the novel. When Mr. Leyden attacks Dimitrios at the end, it appears to be partially in outrage at what Dimitrios has done to a person who has almost become a friend.

Also, in the novel, Peters and Dimitrios kill each other in their confrontation. In the film, Peters emerges wounded but alive, and is hustled away to an uncertain fate.

References

External links
 
 
 
 
 
 

1944 films
1940s mystery thriller films
1940s psychological thriller films
1940s spy thriller films
American mystery thriller films
American spy thriller films
American black-and-white films
Film noir
Films about writers
Films based on British novels
Films directed by Jean Negulesco
Films scored by Adolph Deutsch
Films set in Bulgaria
Films set in Greece
Films set in Istanbul
Films set in Switzerland
Films set in Paris
Warner Bros. films
1940s English-language films
1940s American films